The Philippine television mystery music game show I Can See Your Voice premiered the third season on Kapamilya Channel and A2Z on October 24, 2020.

Due to the COVID-19 pandemic, this program is filmed under health and safety protocols being implemented for this season.

Gameplay

Format
Under the original format, the guest artist can eliminate one or two mystery singers after each round. The game concludes with the last mystery singer standing which depends on the outcome of a duet performance with a guest artist.

Rewards
If singer is good, the guest artist wins an award (as Eyeward). The winning singer, regardless of being good (SEE-nger) or bad (SEE-ntunado), wins .

Rounds
Each episode presents the guest artist with five or six people whose identities and singing voices are kept concealed until they are eliminated to perform on the "stage of truth" or remain in the end to perform the final duet.

Episodes (2020)

Guest artists

SING-vestigators

Episodes (2021)

Guest artists

SING-vestigators

Notes

References

I Can See Your Voice (Philippine game show)
2020 Philippine television seasons
2021 Philippine television seasons
Television series impacted by the COVID-19 pandemic